'Mount Harriet National Park' is a national park located in the Andaman and Nicobar Islands union territory of India. The park, established in 1969,  covers about 4.62 km2 (18.00 mi2). [Mount Harriet, India|Mount Harriet](), which is a part of the park, is the third-highest peak in the Andaman and Nicobar archipelago next to Saddle Peak in North Andaman and Mount Thullier in Great Nicobar.

The park is named in commemoration of Harriet C. Tytler, the second wife of Robert Christopher Tytler, a British army officer, an administrator, naturalist and photographer, who was appointed  Superintendent of the Convict Settlement at Port Blair in the Andamans from April 1862 to February 1864. Harriet is remembered for her work in documenting the monuments of Delhi and for her notes at the time of the Revolt of 1857 in India.

The park's well-known faunal species are Andaman wild pigs (an endangered species), saltwater crocodiles, turtles and robber crabs. The park is also a butterfly hotspot. The picture on the back side of ₹ 20 banknote has been taken at the park.

Geography
Mount Harriet National Park was originally a reserve forest which was converted into a national park in 1979. The mountains in the park are aligned in a north–south direction with the ridges and spurs originating from it aligned in an east–west direction. The eastern face of the park has steep slopes, and the beaches here are also formed of rocks interspersed with small sandy areas. The park is drained by many streams which rise in the hills and flow into the sea on the east. The park experiences marine climatic conditions, and hot and humid conditions in view of its proximity to the equator.

Trekking through the park is popular as it passes through an attractive beach; one can watch endemic avifauna, animals, and butterflies that fly around, and also see elephants carrying lumber.

The tribal community living in the tropical forest of the park are the Negrito people, who are hunter-gatherers.

Flora
The park has evergreen primary forests, and at Chiriyatapu the forest type is mixed deciduous, a combination of primary and secondary forests. The three types of forests are categorized as tropical evergreen, hilltop tropical evergreen and littoral. Overall 134 plant and tree species are reported, including 74 native and 51 introduced species. Some of the plant species of the tropical variety are:Dipterocarpus gracilis, Dipterocarpus grandiflorus, Dipterocarpus kerrii, Endospermum chinensis, and Hopea odorata including Araucaria columnaris which is a conifer native to Caledonia Islands. Plant species of the hilltop tropical variety are  
Canarium manii, Cratoxylum formosum, and Dipterocarpus costatus.

Fauna

Avifauna identified by Bird Life International include seven 'near threatened' species which are: the Andaman wood pigeon (Columba palumboides), Andaman cuckoo-dove (Macropygia rufipennis), Andaman scops-owl (Otus balli), Andaman boobook (Ninox affinis), Andaman woodpecker (Dryocopus hodgei), Andaman drongo (Dicrurus andamanensis), and Andaman treepie (Dendrocitta bayleyi); there are also two species of 'least concern', which are the Andaman coucal (Centropus andamanensis) and white-headed starling (Sturnus erythropygius).

Introduced species include the Asian elephant (Elephas maximus) and chital (Axis axis) apart from ferals. There are 28 reptile species recorded (including 14 species endemic to the Andamans) which are mostly lizards and snakes. The amphibian fauna reported are 6 species; 2 species of Andaman bull frog (Kaloula baleata ghoshi) and Andaman paddy field frog (Limnonectes andamanensis) are endemic.

The aquatic fauna reported from the streams consist of 16 species; some of these species are eel, catfish, gobies, sleepers and snakeheads.

The land molluscs consist of six species. The invertebrate species reported are 355 which include insects to the extent of 70%. In addition, larvae of Samia fulva were noted eating the leaves of Zanthoxylum rhetsa (Rutaceae) and Heteropanax fragrans'' (Araliaceae).

References

Bibliography

National parks in the Andaman and Nicobar Islands
1979 establishments in the Andaman and Nicobar Islands
Protected areas established in 1979